Dryer is a surname. Notable people with the surname include:
Fred Dryer, American pro football player and actor
Ivan Dryer, Designer of laser light shows
Moosie Drier, American actor
Sally Dryer, American voice actress from the 1960s
Thomas J. Dryer, 19th-century American newspaper publisher
Matthew S. Dryer, 20th-century American  professor of linguistics

References